James Elliot-Square (born 22 May 1983) is an English former cricketer. He was a right-handed batsman and a right-arm medium-fast bowler who played for Dorset. He was born in Salisbury, Wiltshire.

Elliot-Square, who made his debut Minor Counties Championship appearance for Dorset during the 2001 season, played in his only List A match in September 2001, against Scotland. Batting in the lower order, Elliot-Square scored a single run, and took bowling figures of 0-21 from three overs.

Most recently, Elliot-Square played for Surrey side Esher in the Cockspur Cup.

External links
James Elliot-Square at Cricket Archive 

1983 births
Living people
English cricketers
Dorset cricketers
Sportspeople from Salisbury